Atebubu District is a former district that was located in Brong-Ahafo Region (now currently in Bono East Region), Ghana. Originally created as an ordinary district assembly on 10 March 1989. However on 12 November 2003 (effectively 18 February 2004), it was split off into two new districts: Atebubu-Amantin District (which it was elevated to municipal district assembly status on 15 March 2018; capital: Atebubu) and Pru District (capital: Yeji). The district assembly was located in the east central part of Brong-Ahafo Region (now east central part of Bono East Region) and had Atebubu as its capital town.

Sources
 
 District: Atebubu District
 19 New Districts Created, November 20, 2003.

References

2003 disestablishments in Ghana

Brong-Ahafo Region

Former districts of Ghana